New Music Weekly is a nationally distributed trade magazine for the US radio and music industries.  Following the tradition of Bill Gavin and the Gavin Report, New Music Weekly interprets data from the Spins Tracking System.  Weekly editorial features include highlights of the top singles impacting radio and "spotlights" of new music from the Top40/Pop, Country, AC/Hot, and College music genres.

The New Music Weekly editorial staff is composed of composer and producer Larry Weir, Billboard magazine, NMW publisher and veteran radio promoter Paul Loggins who also holds the position as Executive Producer of NMW's New Music Awards, and contributing writer Chuck Dauphin.

New Music Awards
The New Music Awards are hosted annually by New Music Weekly, acknowledging the accomplishments of new artists and musicians, radio stations and programmers, music directors, and industry executives in the main music genres.

References

Music magazines published in the United States
Weekly magazines published in the United States
Magazines established in 1997
Magazines published in Los Angeles
Professional and trade magazines